Dillon Danis (born August 22, 1993) is an American mixed martial artist currently competing in the Welterweight division of Bellator MMA.

Background
Born to an Armenian mother and raised in Parsippany–Troy Hills, New Jersey, Danis attended Parsippany Hills High School and started wrestling there as a freshman, despite the fact that he "couldn't do one pushup". He started training in Brazilian Jiu-Jitsu at the age of 15 after he was involved in a fight at school. At 17, Danis started making trips to Marcelo Garcia's academy in New York and at 19 he eventually moved to New York in order to actively pursue a career in Brazilian Jiu-Jitsu. After wins at various high-level tournaments he was rewarded his black belt at 21 years of age.

Mixed martial arts career
In 2016, Danis came to light in the mixed martial arts community when he was asked join the training camp of UFC fighter Conor McGregor as a coach and training partner ahead of his rematch against Nate Diaz at UFC 202. He would continue to work with Conor, helping him to prepare for the Khabib Nurmagomedov bout. Due to his image in the media prior to the fight with Diaz, Marcelo Garcia disassociated Danis from his school.

Bellator MMA
In 2018, Danis was scheduled to make his MMA debut at Bellator 198 against Kyle Walker. He won via a toe hold in the first round of the fight. Danis’ next fight was against Max Humphreys at Bellator 222 at a catchweight of 175 lbs. Danis won the fight via armbar in the first round.

Danis confirmed in 2023 that he has two fights left on his Bellator contract and intends to complete both of them in 2023, along with at least one more fight after.

Grappling events
On May 9, 2015, Danis fought UFC veteran Joe Lauzon at Metamoris 6. Danis won via a D'arc choke.

On October 29, 2016, Danis fought at Polaris Pro Grappling 4 against Jackson Sousa. Danis won via an inside heel hook. He also participated in Polaris 5 at a catchweight (-78 kg)  where he lost a judges decision to Garry Tonon. Danis also commented that he will be participating in an upcoming ADCC event on Ariel Helwani's podcast.

Crossover boxing 
Danis showed up to the press conference for the Misfits boxing promotion owned by influencer KSI. During the press conference, he had a face-off with KSI, at which point Danis struck him before throwing coffee on him. This led to a melee inside the building that would extend to the parking lot, where Danis and many others were involved in an altercation. The two were scheduled to fight on January 14, 2023. However, Danis withdrew on January 4 with Mams Taylor saying the reason being that he is "underprepared, he [Danis] has no coach, he might be struggling with weight."

Championships and accomplishments

Brazilian Jiu-Jitsu
IBJJF Pan Jiu-Jitsu No-Gi Championship
 Purple belt medio: 3rd place (2012)
 Brown belt medio: 2nd place (2013)
 Brown belt medio: 1st place (2014)
 Black belt pesado: 1st place (2016)
IBJJF New York Spring International Open
 Brown belt medio: 2nd place (2015)
 Brown belt open class: 1st place (2015)
IBJJF New York Summer International Open
 Brown belt medio: 1st place (2014)
IBJJF Boca Raton International Open
 Black belt medio: 1st place (2015)
IBJJF World Jiu-Jitsu Championships
 Brown belt medio: 1st place (2014)

Controversies

UFC 229 Nurmagomedov–McGregor post-fight incident 
At UFC 229, Danis—a member of Conor McGregor's corner team—was involved in a melee when Khabib Nurmagomedov, after submitting McGregor, proceeded to throw his mouthpiece at McGregor's corner team and then scaled the cage and appeared to jump towards Danis. Danis responded by throwing punches at Khabib before an all-out brawl ensued. Longtime UFC commentator Joe Rogan has claimed that Danis was insulting Nurmagomedov in an attempt to provoke him stating, "Dillon (Danis) was absolutely insulting Khabib, saying something to him and provoking him and then Khabib just jumped over the cage and attacked him". Danis was subsequently fined $7,500 and suspended for 7 months following the incident. Danis did not comment publicly until March 11, 2019, where he told Ariel Helwani on the ESPN MMA podcast that Khabib started taunting him in the second or third round and was aggressive throughout the event.

New Jersey arrest 
Danis was arrested on September 18, 2021, after getting into an altercation with a bouncer outside a nightclub in New Jersey. Danis later claimed that the bouncer and bartenders from the nightclub were at fault for the altercation, and that officers released him after approximately twenty minutes.

ADCC PEDs accusations 
In October 2021, Danis accused UFC veteran Jake Shields of offering him PEDs prior to the 2017 ADCC Submission Fighting World Championship.

UFC 268 altercation 
Danis was removed from the building at UFC 268 on November 6, 2021, after getting into an altercation with MMA manager Ali Abdelaziz where he was slapped by Abdelaziz.

Alleged endorsement of cryptocurrency scams 
In February 2023, Coffeezilla, a YouTuber known for exposing cryptocurrency scams, accused Danis of accepting cash to promote cryptocurrency and NFT scams to his social media followers without performing due diligence. Coffeezilla's team paid Danis $1,000 to promote a fake NFT project on his Twitter account, which actually contained a link to a website listing 20 cryptocurrency and NFT projects that Dillon endorsed and Coffeezilla claims are scams. According to Insider, Danis is yet to issue a response to the allegations.

Mixed martial arts record

|-
|Win
|align=center|2–0
|Max Humphrey
|Submission (armbar)
|Bellator 222
|
|align=center|1
|align=center|4:28
|New York, United States
|
|-
|Win
|align=center|1–0
|Kyle Walker
|Submission (toe hold)
|Bellator 198
|
|align=center|1
|align=center|1:38
|Rosemont, Illinois, United States
|
|-

Submission grappling record 
{| class="wikitable sortable" style="font-size:80%; text-align:left;"
|-
| colspan=8 style="text-align:center;" | 9 Matches, 3 Wins, 6 Losses 0 Draws
|-
!  Result
!  Rec.
!  Opponent
!  Method
!  text-center| Event
!  Date
!  Location
|-
| Loss ||align=center|3–6||  Gordon Ryan || Referee Decision || rowspan=3|ADCC 2017 || rowspan=3|September 23, 2017 || rowspan=3|  Espoo, Finland
|-
| Win ||align=center|3–5||  Yukiyasu Ozawa || N/A
|-
| Loss ||align=center|2–5||  Mahamed Aly || N/A  
|-
| Loss ||align=center|2–4||  Jake Shields || N/A || Submission Underground 4 || May 14, 2017 || Portland, OR, United States  
|-
| Loss ||align=center|2–3||  AJ Agazarm || N/A || Submission Underground 3 || January 29, 2017 ||  Portland, OR, United States
|-
| Loss ||align=center|2–2||  Max Gimenis || N/A || Copa Podio || July 9, 2016 ||   Palermo, Buenos Aires, Argentina
|-
| Win ||align=center|2–1||  Joe Lauzon || Submission (D'Arce Choke) || Metamoris 6 || May 9, 2015 ||   California, United States
|-
| Loss ||align=center|1–1||  Jonathan Satava || N/A || rowspan=2|2014 IBJJF World Jiu Jitsu No-Gi Championship || rowspan=2|October 5, 2014 || rowspan=2|  Azusa, California, United States
|-
| Win ||align=center|1–0||  Mansher Khera || N/A
|-

See also
List of current Bellator fighters

References

1993 births
American practitioners of Brazilian jiu-jitsu
American male mixed martial artists
Welterweight mixed martial artists
Mixed martial artists from New Jersey
Mixed martial artists utilizing Brazilian jiu-jitsu
Living people
Bellator male fighters
Parsippany Hills High School alumni
People from Parsippany-Troy Hills, New Jersey
Sportspeople from Morris County, New Jersey
American male boxers